The 1956 United States presidential election in Minnesota took place on November 6, 1956, as part of the 1956 United States presidential election. Voters chose 11 electors, or representatives to the Electoral College, who voted for president and vice president.

Minnesota was won by the Republican Party candidate, incumbent President Dwight D. Eisenhower won the state over former Illinois governor Adlai Stevenson by a margin of 101,777 votes, or 7.6%, which made Minnesota 8% more Democratic than the nation-at-large. Eisenhower went on to win the election nationally, with 457 electoral votes and a landslide 15.4% lead over Stevenson in the popular vote. The 1956 presidential election was a rematch of the 1952 election, in which Eisenhower also defeated Stevenson, both nationally and in Minnesota. , this is the last time Minnesota was carried in two consecutive elections by the Republican nominee.

The Democratic nomination campaign leading into 1956 presidential election may have had a major role in the end of the political career of Coya Knutson, the first woman to be elected to the United States House of Representatives from Minnesota. The Minnesota Democratic-Farmer-Labor Party, in a ploy to win a possible vice presidential nomination for its rising star, U.S. Senator Hubert Humphrey, desperately attempted to ensure that Stevenson would win in the DFL Presidential Primary in Minnesota that year. However, Congresswoman Knutson, believing that the agricultural policy positions of U.S. Senator Estes Kefauver of Tennessee would have been more beneficial to her constituents, instead endorsed and campaigned on behalf of Kefauver. In part due to Knutson's efforts, Kefauver won the March 20th Minnesota Presidential Primary; as a result, when Stevenson was ultimately nominated, Kefauver was chosen as his running mate.

Two years later, shortly before the 1958 DFL state convention, a letter signed but not written by Knutson's husband was circulated to reporters. The contents of the letter played on anxieties over deviations from the rigid gender roles of the time, and its publication by newspapers essentially ensured Knutson's defeat in her bid for re-election that year. It has been alleged by several individuals, including Concordia College political science professor Harding Noblitt, Knutson biographer Gretchen Beito, and numerous people who were close to Knutson, that either DFL state leadership or local operatives wrote the letter and bribed Knutson's husband to sign it, as a means to exact retribution against the Congresswoman for denying Humphrey a shot at the vice presidential nomination in 1956. 

Minnesota would not vote Republican again until Eisenhower’s running mate, Richard Nixon, won the state in his re-election bid in 1972. Since then it has become a reliably Democratic state.

Results

Results by county

See also
 United States presidential elections in Minnesota

Notes

References

1956
Min
1956 Minnesota elections